Marc Guggenheim (born September 24, 1970) is an American screenwriter, television producer, comic book writer, and novelist. He is best known as the creator of the television series Eli Stone (2008–2009), Arrow (2012– 2020), and Legends of Tomorrow (2016–2022), executive producer of the animated series Tales of Arcadia (2016–2021), as well as the writer of the feature films Green Lantern (2011), and Percy Jackson: Sea of Monsters (2013).

Early life 
Marc Guggenheim was born and raised to a Jewish family on Long Island, New York. He attended the University at Albany, State University of New York. His brothers are screenwriters Eric Guggenheim and David Guggenheim.

Career 
Guggenheim worked in Boston, Massachusetts as a lawyer at Hutchins Wheeler & Dittmar, and part-time writer for five years.

Television 
After a romantic comedy script led to a few meetings with producers, he moved to California to pursue a career as a screenwriter. A script for The Practice was his first produced work. He eventually served as a producer for Law & Order, Jack and Bobby, CSI: Miami, and In Justice.

With Greg Berlanti, Guggenheim is the co-creator of the ABC show Eli Stone. He later became executive producer of ABC's No Ordinary Family. Guggenheim, together with Berlanti and Andrew Kreisberg, adapted the Green Arrow comics into the television series Arrow. The three, alongside Phil Klemmer, went on to develop the spin-off series Legends of Tomorrow. Guggenheim served as co-showrunner on Arrow for seasons 1-6 and 8, and on Legends of Tomorrow for seasons 1-4. From the fall of 2018, he stepped down as showrunner and serve as an executive consultant to both shows.

With Guillermo del Toro, he co-wrote the pilot and several episodes of the award-winning animated series Tales of Arcadia, an original franchise created for Netflix from DreamWorks Animation, for which he won an Emmy in the category of "Best Writing for an Animated Series" and nominated for several others. He remained as Executive Producer throughout the series' three installments, Trollhunters, 3Below and Wizards: Tales of Arcadia.

In October 2020, it was announced that Guggenheim would be writing a series based on Green Lantern alongside Seth Grahame-Smith, who is showrunning the series, for HBO Max in 2021. However, In October 2022, when Grahame-Smith departed from the series, Guggenheim has confirmed he is no longer involved.

Comic books 
He served as an intern at Marvel for a time in 1990 for editor Terry Kavanagh, and was the colorist for an eight-page Iceman/Human Torch story while there. His writing experiences also include the comic books Aquaman for DC Comics, Wolverine and The Punisher for Marvel, and  Perfect Dark Zero for Rare Game. He wrote Blade for twelve issues with artist Howard Chaykin.

In 2006, Guggenheim took over the writing of The Flash. Guggenheim's run concluded with the death of the fourth Flash, Bart Allen.

In 2007, Guggenheim became one of the rotating team of writers on The Amazing Spider-Man. His first story appeared in Amazing Spider-Man #549. He also launched a creator-owned comic, Resurrection, for Oni Press.

He wrote the comic book Young X-Men for Marvel which was launched in April 2008, and in 2008 was working on a comic with Hugh Jackman and Virgin Comics, Nowhere Man, and on Super Zombies for Dynamite Entertainment and Stephen King.

He wrote the script for the 2009 video game X-Men Origins: Wolverine, developed by Raven Software, a video game based on the film of the same name.

Guggenheim was intended to take over Action Comics after the War of the Supermen limited series, but was replaced by Paul Cornell. Guggenheim instead worked on Justice Society of America.

Personal life
Guggenheim is married to fellow writer-producer Tara Butters, who has previously worked on projects including Marvel's Agent Carter, ABC's Resurrection and Dollhouse.

Filmography

Bibliography

Novels 
 Overwatch (2014)
 Arrow: Fatal Legacies (2018) co-authored with James R. Tuck

Comics

DC Comics
 Batman Confidential #50–54 (2011)
 Arrow Special Edition #1 (2012)
 Arrow #1–12 (2012–2013)
 Adventures of Superman vol. 2 #8 (2013)
 Legends of the Dark Knight 100-Page Super Spectacular #4 (2014)
 Arrow: Season 2.5 #1–12 (2014–2015)
 Flash: Season Zero #5 (plot) (2015)
 Love is Love OGN (Batman) (2016)
 Crisis on Infinite Earths Giant #1–2 (with Marv Wolfman) (2019–2020)
 Titans Giant #1 (2020)
 Batman: Gotham Nights #11, 18, 20 (digital) (2020)

Marvel Comics 
 Punisher: The Trial of the Punisher #1–2 (2013)
 X-Men vol 4 #18–22 (2014)
 collected in: X-Men Volume 4: Exogenous (tpb, 112 pages, 2015)
 Daredevil vol. 4 #15.1 (2015)
 All-New, All-Different Marvel Point One #1 (S.H.I.E.L.D.) (2015)
 Squadron Sinister #1–4 (2015)
 collected in: Squadron Sinister (tpb, 141 pages, 2015):
 X-Tinction Agenda #1–4 (2015)
 collected in X-Tinction Agenda: Warzones! (tpb, 112 pages, 2016)
 The Accused #1 (2016)
 Agents of S.H.I.E.L.D #1–10 (2016)
 X-Men Prime #1 (2017)
X-Men Gold #1–36, Annual #1 (2017–2018)
Star Wars: Age of Rebellion Special #1 (2019)

Oni Press 
 Stringers #1–5 (2015)
 collected in: Stringers Volume 1 (tpb, 141 pages, 2016)

Legendary Comics 
 The Infinite Adventures of Jonas Quantum #1–6 (2015–2016)

References

External links 

THE PULSE talks to Guggenheim about his work on DC's FLASH comic book series!
THE PULSE: Marc Guggenheim on working with Marvel's BLADE comic book series
THE PULSE talks to Guggenheim about the Hyperion vs. Nighthawk Marvel comic book series
THE PULSE: Marc Guggenheim at SDCC '06 on Marvel's Civil War
THE PULSE: Guggenheim puts The Punisher on Trial in THE PEOPLE Vs. Frank Castle
Marc Guggenheim discusses his musical tastes on Marvel.com
Youth Served: Guggenheim Talks "Young X-Men", Comic Book Resources

1970 births
Living people
American comics writers
Jewish American screenwriters
American television writers
Showrunners
Marvel Comics people
Comics colorists
American male television writers
21st-century American male writers
21st-century American screenwriters